Tennis competitions at the 2010 Asian Games in Guangzhou, China were held from November 13 to November 23 at the Guangdong Olympic Tennis Centre.

A total of 129 tennis players from 22 nations competed in tennis at the 2010 Asian Games, Chinese Taipei finished first at the medal table by winning three gold medals.

Schedule

Medalists

Medal table

Participating nations
A total of 129 athletes from 22 nations competed in tennis at the 2010 Asian Games:

See also
 Tennis at the Asian Games

External links
Tennis Site of 2010 Asian Games
2010 Asian Games Women's singles Draw

 
2010
Asian Games
2010 Asian Games events
2010 Asian Games